The Pasadena Motorcycle Club is an American motorcycle club known, from its founding in 1907 through the 1970s, for sponsoring events such as  enduro and hare and hound races, and, since the 1980s, for street riding, poker runs and charity events.

Formed on May 20, 1907 in Pasadena, California, the Pasadena Motorcycle Club was called by Rider magazine the third oldest in the US, in a tie with the Oakland MC, also formed in 1907. The older clubs are the Yonkers Motorcycle Club, formed in 1903 and the San Francisco Motorcycle Club, 1904.

The Club was active through World War I and World War II. The PMC has had several clubhouses before moving into the current Howard Street location in 1946. The PMC is a family club, not an outlaw motorcycle club. It promotes motorcycle road rides and events every year that are open to the public, often benefiting a charity such as the Optimist Youth Homes and Family Services. Since 1937, the PMC has run the annual two-day Greenhorn Enduro, originally a grueling  desert enduro, becoming, after 1979, a scenic road tour.

Notable members

References

External links

1907 establishments in California
Motorcycle clubs in the United States